Ford Peak is a rock peak,  high, standing  west of Mount Billing in the Prince Albert Mountains of Victoria Land, Antarctica. It was named by the Southern Party of the New Zealand Geological Survey Antarctic Expedition, 1962–63, for M.R.J. Ford, assistant surveyor with that party, who had wintered over at Scott Base in 1962.

Mountains of Victoria Land
Scott Coast